Terry High School is a suburban public high school located in Terry, Mississippi, United States. It is a part of the Hinds County School District.

It serves Terry, Byram, and sections of Jackson.

References

External links
 Terry High School

Public high schools in Mississippi
Schools in Hinds County, Mississippi